R707 road may refer to:
 R707 road (Ireland)
 R707 (South Africa)